Egrespatak is the Hungarian name for two places in Romania:

 Valea Agrişului village, Iara Commune, Cluj County
 Meseșenii de Jos Commune, Sălaj County